Anatoliy Klimanov (28 October 1949 – 2 March 2009) was a Ukrainian boxer. He competed in the men's light heavyweight event at the 1976 Summer Olympics. Klimanov defeated Roger Fortin of Canada, before losing to Leon Spinks of the United States.

References

External links
 

1949 births
2009 deaths
Ukrainian male boxers
Olympic boxers of the Soviet Union
Boxers at the 1976 Summer Olympics
Sportspeople from Kyiv
AIBA World Boxing Championships medalists
Light-heavyweight boxers